Vorarlberghalle is an indoor sporting arena located in Feldkirch, Austria.  The capacity of the arena is 5,200 people (2000) and was built in 1977.  It is currently home of The VEU Feldkirch Ice Hockey Team

Indoor ice hockey venues in Austria
Sports venues in Vorarlberg